The Kentucky Three-Day Event, currently the Land Rover Kentucky Three-Day Event due to sponsorship, is an eventing competition held at the Kentucky Horse Park in Lexington, Kentucky.  Land Rover Kentucky is a CCI5*-L eventing competition. Five stars is the highest level of competition in the sport, the same level of competition as Eventing at the Olympics and the World Equestrian Games. The event is sponsored by Land Rover.  Prize money of $ is distributed among the top placings with $ as well as a Rolex watch awarded to the first place horse and rider.

Although the event's name continues to reflect its roots as a three-day competition, the Kentucky Three-Day Event currently takes place over four days (Thursday through Sunday). Due to large number of entries, both Thursday and Friday are devoted to the dressage test. Cross-country is on Saturday, and show jumping is on Sunday.

The Kentucky Three-Day Event is held the last weekend of April, the week before the Kentucky Derby. It is one of the three events in the Rolex Grand Slam of Eventing.

History

In 1974, Bruce Davidson and the United States Equestrian Team won individual and team gold at the World Championships held in Burghley, England. This gave the United States the right to hold the next World Championships four years later, in 1978. The Kentucky Horse Park in Lexington, Kentucky was due to open around the same time, and plans were made to hold the World Championships there.

Equestrian Events, Inc. (EEI) was formed to as a non-profit organization to help plan the competition and raise public awareness. The first horse trials at the Kentucky Horse Park was held in 1976, to prepare. In 1977, the National Pony Club Rally and the North American Junior Three-Day Event Championships were also held there.

The 1978 event had more than 170,000 spectators and added more than $4 million to the local economy. The event was broadcast worldwide, as well as nationally on CBS. The success of the World Championships helped to convince the EEU to continue the event annually. Today, the event is broadcast worldwide in 18 languages.

Although the event began as an advanced three-day, and later included open intermediate and preliminary competitions, today it only holds the highest level: the CCI****. Intermediate-level competition was held in 1979 and from 1985 to 1981. An Advanced-level CCI was held from 1980 to 1999 up to the *** level, with Advanced Horse Trials (non-CCI) also held from 1992 to 1996. The CCI**** was begun in 1998, and has been held annually since. Since 2000, the CCI**** is the only competition held during this time, and the preliminary, intermediate, and CCI*** levels are not offered.

The Kentucky Three-Day Event also hoped to continue the classic format, despite the other major events around the world switching to the short format. Originally, the plan was to alternate years, offering the short format in even-numbered years as preparation for the Olympic games or the World Championship, while running the classic format in odd-numbered years. However, in 2006 it was announced that, due to lack of funds and interest from upper level riders, the event would only offer the short format. Therefore, all competition run before 2005 (excluding the 2004 Modified division) was run "classic format," and from the 2006 event onward has been run in the "short format."

The CCI****
The CCI**** competition was first suggested in 1994 by Denny Emerson, who believed the United States had enough competitors at this high level to warrant the development of a four-star. Previously, American riders trained in England when they were preparing for international competition, as the country had the only two annual CCI**** at that time: Badminton and Burghley. The USET began making plans in 1996, and held the country's first and the world's third annual four-star competition at the Kentucky Horse Park in 1998.

The CCI***** 
After the 2018 season, the FEI added an introductory level below CCI*, bumping all subsequent levels upward. While there was no change to the difficulty of the competition, the added level forced all former CCI**** competitions to re-classify as CCI*****.

Physicality of the sport
This sport takes many different precautions concerning the horse's health. Two horses died of a heart attack on the course in April 2008.

Self-efficacy is a way to assess themselves and the horse using a scientific method. Evaluating the health of the horse is important because the horse could easily get injured.

A study was done to compare the heart rate between a trained and untrained horse. The results show that trained horses do not have more stress or pain in comparison with untrained horses. However, if evaluated 30 minutes before competition, the trained horse would show less stress. According to this experiment the training method, "Deep and Round", put more stress on the horse.

Winners

References

External links
 Land Rover Kentucky Three-Day Event Official site

Eventing
Sports in Lexington, Kentucky
Equestrian sports in the United States